is a Japanese football player.

Career
Hiromu Kori joined J2 League club Tokyo Verdy in 2016. In July, he moved to J3 League club Grulla Morioka.

Career statistics

Last update: 3 December 2017

Reserves performance

References

External links

1997 births
Living people
Association football people from Tokyo
Japanese footballers
J2 League players
J3 League players
Tokyo Verdy players
Iwate Grulla Morioka players
Gamba Osaka U-23 players
Association football forwards